Maleshe is a village in Kgalagadi District of Botswana. It is located close the capital of the district, Tshabong, and it has a primary school. The population was 462 in 2011 census. Maleshe also has a clinic, small business tuckshops and retailers.

References

Kgalagadi District
Villages in Botswana